State Route 212 (SR 212) is part of Maine's highway system, running from SR 11 in Moro Plantation to U.S. Route 2 (US 2) in Smyrna (within the community of Smyrna Mills), where a local road continues to serve the town of Oakfield. The route also provides access to the town of Merrill.

Major junctions

See also

References

External links

Floodgap Roadgap's RoadsAroundME: Maine State Route 212

212
Transportation in Aroostook County, Maine